Allantoparmelia is a genus of lichenised fungi in the large family Parmeliaceae. It is a genus of only three currently accepted species.  All three Allantoparmelia lichens have a foliose growth form. They appear to be a very slow growing group of lichens, with a mean annual thallus diameter increase of only 0.23–0.35 mm per year.

Citations

References
 
 

Parmeliaceae
Lecanorales genera
Lichen genera
Taxa named by Edvard August Vainio